Bhaktisvarupa Damodara Swami (9 December 1937 – 2 October 2006), also known as Dr. Thoudam Damodara Singh and by the honorific Sripada, was a Gaudiya Vaishnava spiritual leader, chemist, writer about religion and science, and poet. In 1971 he received spiritual initiation from A. C. Bhaktivedanta Swami Prabhupada. A few years later he became one of the religious leaders of the International Society for Krishna Consciousness (also known as the Hare Krishna Movement).

For more than thirty years he was the international director of the Bhaktivedanta Institute which promotes the study of the relationship between religion and science (Vedanta). Srila Bhaktisvarupa Damodara Swami Maharaja was a pioneer in "advancing the dialogue on synthesis of science and spirituality throughout the world". He was a co-founder and regional director of United Religions Initiative, a member of Metanexus Institute, founding rector of University of Bhagavata Culture (2000) in the State of Manipur (India) and founding member of the World Vaisnava Association. He authored and edited several books and organised a number of significant conferences and world congresses around the world, where a number of prominent scientists and religious leaders including several Nobel Laureates participated. He was the Editor-in-chief of the Journal of the Bhaktivedanta Institute entitled, Savijnanam: Scientific Exploration for a Spiritual Paradigm.

Biography

Early life

Thoudam Damodar was born in Toubul, part of the Bishnupur district, Manipur, India, on 9 December 1937 to Sri Thoudam Yogendra Singh and Srimati Kanyahanbi Devi. During World War II on 10 May 1942, the Japanese began bombing Imphal, the Capital of Manipur. Yogendra Singh took his family to shelter in a barrack on the banks of the Yangoi river. In 1944, Yogendra died of typhoid. The war eventually came to end, his uncle Thoudam Ibomcha Singh struggled through tough times to support him and shortly thereafter Thoudam Damodar was separated from his mother and younger sister. His elder sister Srimati Ahanbi Devi began to look after him. As a young boy, he learned how to till the land left by his father to help maintain himself and his sister. In 1949, his sister got married and he was left alone. Not wanting to burden anyone, he used to cultivate paddy for his livelihood. Living through hardships, Thoudam Damodar planned to give up schooling. Seeing his adversity, Sri Thokchom Yadav Singh, his primary school teacher, approached his colleague Sri Thoudam Kerani Singh and requested to help Thoudam Damodar. Sri Thoudam Kerani Singh agreed, and Thoudam Damodar moved into Sri Kerani's home.

Education
Thoudam Damodar received his BSc with honours from Gauhati University in 1961, his Master of Technology degree with honours from the University of Calcutta in 1964, his MSc in chemistry from Canisius College, New York in 1969, and in 1974 completed his PhD in physical organic chemistry at the University of California, Irvine. Since then he has been involved in dialogues with prominent scientists and religious leaders such as the Dalai Lama in the quest for a scientific understanding of the world through the vedantic paradigm.

Spiritual service to ISKCON
Thoudam Damodar Singh, then as a student at the University of California, Irvine had a very good friend in Ray Ramananda Dasa, who became a student of Bhaktivedanta Swami Prabhupada. Ray Ramananda Dasa inspired T D Singh to meet Swami Prabhupada. After coming into contact with Swami Prabhupada and students of the International Society for Krishna Consciousness, Thoudam Damodar received spiritual initiation from him at the Sri Radha Krishna Temple in Los Angeles, on 30 June 1971, and was given the name Svarupa Damodar Das. He studied the philosophy and practice of Vaishnavism for the following 8 years under the guidance of his spiritual master. Swami Prabhupada appointed Svarupa Damodar das as International Director of the Bhaktivedanta Institute in 1974 and a member of Governing Body Commission in March 1977. In 1980 he took sannyasa from Kirtanananda Swami. In 1982 he became an initiating spiritual master and began to accept disciples. During his life, he provided a spiritual guidance to over a thousand of his disciples around the world. He is well known as Srila Bhaktisvarupa Damodara Goswami Maharaja (also known as Srila Sripad Maharaja and Dr. T.D. Singh).

Bhaktivedanta Institute – A Mission Transforming Material Science into Spiritual Science
On Srila Sripad Maharaja's 75th divine appearance day, one of his scientist disciple Bhakti Niskama Shanta Swami, Ph.D. wrote a summary of the services of Srila Sripad Maharaja under the banner of Bhaktivedanta Institute. In the honor of Srila Sripad Maharaja his scientist disciples are organizing an annual international conference series "Is Science Able to Explain the Scientist? (Science and Scientist)" under the guidance of Sripad Bhakti Madhava Puri Maharaja, Ph.D. (Serving Director, Bhakti Vedanta Institute, Princeton, NJ, USA).

Science and Vedanta
Bhaktisvarupa Damodara Swami has contributed many papers in the Journal of the American Chemical Society and the Journal of Organic Chemistry in the field of fast proton transfer kinetics in model biological systems using stopped-flow technique and NMR spectroscopy. He also worked on gas phase reaction mechanisms using Ion Cyclotron Resonance (ICR) spectroscopy.

For more than thirty years he was the international director of the Bhaktivedanta Institute which promotes the study of the relationship between science and Vedanta. Srila Bhaktisvarupa Damodara Goswami Maharaja was a pioneer in "advancing the dialogue on synthesis of science and spirituality throughout the world". He was a co-founder and regional director of United Religions Initiative, a member of Metanexus Institute and founding member of the World Vaisnava Association. He authored and edited several books and organised several International conferences on science and religion, where a number of prominent scientists and religious leaders including several Nobel Laureates participated: First and Second World Congress for the Synthesis of Science and Religion (1986 and 1997), First International Conference on the Study of Consciousness within Science (1990), and "Second International Congress on Life and its Origin: Exploration from Science and Various Spiritual and Religious Traditions" (2004, Rome, Italy). For these conferences a group of internationally acclaimed scholars from various disciplines were invited to talk about "the present status of science and religion, the history of discord between them, and the potential benefits of their reconciliation".

From 1992 to 2006 he served as the President of Vedanta and Science Educational Research Foundation and worked to interface Science and Vedanta, the essence of Hindu Religious traditions. He felt that the universal principles contained in the Vedanta can make a significant contribution in Science and Spirituality. He launched The Journal of the Bhaktivedanta Institute, "Savijnanam", aimed at "Scientific Exploration for a Spiritual Paradigm" and was its Editor-in-Chief.

In 2000, Srila Bhaktisvarupa Damodara Goswami Maharaja's interest in science and spirituality has led him to set up the University of Bhagavata Culture in Imphal, Manipur). The purpose of the University is to "promote the universal scientific and philosophical relevance of the teachings of Bhagavad Gita, Srimad Bhagavatam, Vedanta and other Vedic literatures within the framework of modern cultural and educational milieu for the welfare of humanity."

Cultural projects
Srila Bhaktisvarupa Damodara Goswami Maharaja started a network of schools in Northeastern India where more than 4000 students receive education centred on Vaishnava spiritual values.

In 1989 he founded "Ranganiketan Manipuri Cultural Arts Troupe" which has approximately 600 performances at over 300 venues in over 15 countries. Ranganiketan (literally "House of Colorful Arts") is a group of more than twenty dancers, musicians, singers, martial artists, choreographers and craft artisans. Some of them are gurus in their own respective fields of art. Their performances both at home and abroad, received acclaim and awards. While at home in Manipur, they often perform at various religious and cultural functions. They are not paid a salary, but live from donations that are offered to them for their artistic contributions.

Works

See also
Gaudiya Vaishnavism
United Religions Initiative

References

Sources

External links
T.D. Singh, Ph.D. (Bhaktisvarupa Damodara Maharaja)
Bhaktivedanta Institute Kolkata
T.D. Singh Foundation
Ranganiketan: Manipuri Cultural Arts Troupe
Objectification of science needs transfusion of Eastern spirituality New Straits Times 15 June 2000
Article: Two spiritual organisations sign MoU, New Straits Times 19 October 2000
More condemn terror attack, The Sangai Express 20 Aug 2006
Krishna consciousness is the way to peaceful life The Sangai Express
Metanexus

1937 births
2006 deaths
20th-century Hindu philosophers and theologians
21st-century Hindu philosophers and theologians
20th-century Hindu religious leaders
21st-century Hindu religious leaders
20th-century Indian poets
International Society for Krishna Consciousness religious figures
Hindu writers
Indian Hare Krishnas
Indian Hindu monks
Indian Hindu religious leaders
Indian organic chemists
Indian theologians
Indian Vaishnavites
People in interfaith dialogue
Writers about religion and science
University of Calcutta alumni
Canisius College alumni
University of California, Irvine alumni
Poets from Manipur
Scholars from Manipur
Meitei people
People from Bishnupur, Manipur
Hinduism and science